Animania was an annual anime convention that was held in Sydney, Australia. Originally run by local University anime societies, Animania is now organised by Aurora Entertainment, and includes several events in Sydney, Brisbane, Melbourne, and Adelaide. The term Animania in the 1990s referred to online-organized meetings of Animaniacs fans from around the world.

Programming
Animania features many of the typical events found at anime conventions including cosplay and AMV (anime music video) competitions, anime screenings, workshops, karaoke, video games such as Dance Dance Revolution.

In addition to such staples, Animania has experimented with several of its own attractions, such as live fandubbing, an "Iron Artist" drawing competition based on the Iron Chef TV show, the anime cover-band Halcyon, and "Animania Fusion", a skit-based video comedy featuring members of Animania staff.

Halcyon

Halcyon made their debut at Animania 2003 and at that time consisted of three members: Amanda Setiadi as the vocalist, Michael Lee (aka "Muki") as the acoustic guitar player, and Rosi Yu as the violinist. The band performed a small set and were sufficiently popular to warrant their return for Animania in 2005, as well as making appearances at other anime-related events in Sydney. The band has also grown from the original three-member setup to six, including a drummer, Michael Ip, and two more guitarists, Lindsay Nighjoy on bass and Jason Solomon on lead.

At the main Sydney Animania in 2007, Halcyon played two sets, including an acoustic set (without drums) at the Friday preview night, and with the full band on the Saturday night.

Halcyon's "style" is playing songs that have appeared in anime and Japanese video games, creating original translations (and occasionally reinterpretations) of the Japanese lyrics. Songs they have covered include Fly Me to the Moon from Neon Genesis Evangelion and HT from Trigun.

World Cosplay Summit
At the September 2007 Sydney event Animania announced they had been accepted by the World Cosplay Summit to host the Australian competitions to compete in Japan at WCS 2009. This will be the first time Australia has been represented at WCS.

Preliminary competition events will be held at the 2008 events with the finals taking place at August 2008 Sydney event. The winning team will be flown to Japan in 2009 to compete in the World Cosplay Summit. The team representing Australia for the first time is the Love and Peace Movement, consisting of Tsubaki Chan and Cattypatra.

History

In 2008 the first World Cosplay Summit Australian Preliminaries took place at Animania, with the finalists competing in the 2009 World Cosplay Summit Championship (Japan).

The 2008 Sydney August event featured two live concerts: Argent La Rosa, a J-Rock styled band, and Yunyu.

In 2009 Animania partnered with the Adelaide OzAsia Festival, expanding the event to 4 cities.

Event history

See also
 List of anime conventions

References

External links

 Animania Festival - Animania Festival's Official website.
 World Cosplay Summit - World Cosplay Summit 2008 Website.

Defunct anime conventions
Festivals in Sydney
Conventions in Australia